Sorry is the second studio album by Canadian punk rock band White Lung, released on May 29, 2012, on Deranged Records. New Jersey's Aquarian Weekly reported that the album "earned them a hearty critical reception at SXSW".

Reception

Rolling Stone named the album one of "The 10 Best Albums of 2012", saying: "Vancouver kids bang through ten bursts of female punk fury in 19 minutes, with Mish Way's hungry yowl leading the charge. Nothing fancy here – you get thrashed, you get bashed, you notice strange bruises all over your shins, then as soon as it's over you press play again."
NOW Magazine report that the album's "ferocious mix of snarling hooks and hardcore urgency (together, the 10 songs clock in at under 20 minutes) found sympathetic ears at publications as big as Rolling Stone, and suddenly White Lung started getting invites to festivals like NXNE and Pitchfork."

Track listing
All songs written and composed by White Lung
"Take the Mirror" - 1:22
"St. Dad" - 2:15
"Thick Lip" - 1:47
"Bag" - 1:49
"Bunny" - 2:01
"I Rot" - 2:14
"Glue" - 2:11
"Those Girls" - 2:04
"The Bad Way" - 2:00
"Deadbeat" - 0:57

Personnel
Mish Way – vocals
Kenneth William – guitar
Grady Mackintosh – bass guitar
Anne-Marie Vassiliou – drums

References

2012 albums
White Lung albums
Deranged Records albums